The 1891 Wake Forest Baptists football team was an American football team that represented Wake Forest College during the 1891 college football season

Schedule

References

Wake Forest
Wake Forest Demon Deacons football seasons
College football undefeated seasons
Wake Forest Baptists football